The Portable Galaxie 500 is a compilation album by the rock band Galaxie 500. It was released in 1998 on Rykodisc.

Track listing
All songs written by Galaxie 500 except as noted.
 "Blue Thunder" (w/sax)
 "Flowers" 
 "When Will You Come Home" 
 "Listen, The Snow Is Falling" (Yoko Ono) 
 "Sorry"
 "Fourth of July" 
 "Don't Let Our Youth Go to Waste" (Jonathan Richman)
 "Strange"
 "Another Day"
 "Snowstorm"
 "Summertime" (live)
 "Tugboat"

Releases

References

External links
Lyrics and Tablature 

1998 compilation albums
Galaxie 500 albums
Rykodisc compilation albums